Richard Reichmuth (born May 21, 1969) is an American meteorologist who is best known for his 11-year career on the Fox News program Fox & Friends.

Early life and education
Rick was born and raised in Prescott, Arizona and graduated from Arizona State University with a degree in Spanish Literature. After nearly a decade in banking, he decided to make a change and pursue a lifelong dream in meteorology.

Career
Rick began his television career as a Production Assistant for CNN en Español in Atlanta, Georgia and began his on-air career at CNN Headline News, CNN and CNN International. From 2004–2006, Rick conducted live weather forecasts as a meteorologist for Weather Services International in Andover, MA.

He is currently the Chief Meteorologist at Fox News Channel.

Rick is an American Meteorological Society Television Seal Holder (1679)

Weatherman Umbrella
Rick developed a line of umbrellas called "Weatherman," which launched November 16, 2017. After years in the field covering severe weather events, Rick couldn’t find an umbrella that met his standards. The result after three years of research, sketching, testing and more testing is an umbrella that stands up to extreme weather.

References

External links
 

1969 births
Living people
Fox News people
People from Prescott, Arizona
American meteorologists
American television personalities
Weather presenters